The Assertion Definition Language (ADL) is a specification language providing a formal grammar to specify behaviour and interfaces for computer software. ADL uses function pre- and postconditions to specify interfaces and is designed to provide an intermediary between informal English language specifications and formal programmatic test specifications. Tool support exists both to convert ADL specifications into natural language, and to generate test systems against which implementation code can be verified.

ADL is developed cooperatively by The Open Group and SunTest of Sun Microsystems

See also
 Formal methods
 Formal specification

References

External links
 ADL Homepage

Formal specification languages